Bahraich Lok Sabha constituency is one of the 80 Lok Sabha (parliamentary)  constituencies in Uttar Pradesh state in northern India. Bahraich is reserved for the SC category.

Assembly segments
After delimitation, this constituency comprises the following five assembly segments:

Before delimitation of parliamentary constituencies in 2008, Bahraich Lok Sabha constituency comprised the following five assembly segments:
 Nanpara 
 Charda
 Bhinga 
 Bahraich 
 Ikauna

Members of Parliament

Election results

Lok Sabha election 2019

Lok Sabha election 2014

Lok Sabha election 2009

Lok Sabha election 1980
 Mulana Saiyad Muzaffar Hussain (INC-I) : 112,358 votes  
 Om Prakash Tyagi (BJS) : 62,468

Lok Sabha election 1971
 Badlu Ram (INC) : 94,666 votes  
 Om Prakash Tyagi (BJS) : 69,171

See also
 Bahraich district
 List of Constituencies of the Lok Sabha

External links
Bahraich lok sabha  constituency election 2019 result
Election Results of Bahraich Lok Sabha from 1971

References

Lok Sabha constituencies in Uttar Pradesh
Politics of Bahraich district